Culpas ajenas  (English title: Sins of others) is a Mexican telenovela produced by Televisa and transmitted by Telesistema Mexicano.

Silvia Caos and Raúl Farell starred as protagonists.

Cast 
Silvia Caos
Raúl Farell
Carmelita González
Roberto Cañedo
Francisco Jambrina

References 

Mexican telenovelas
1961 telenovelas
Televisa telenovelas
1961 Mexican television series debuts
1961 Mexican television series endings
Spanish-language telenovelas